René Marc Jalbert  (20 February 1921 – 21 January 1996) was a retired Canadian Forces officer and sergeant-at-arms of the National Assembly of Quebec, known for his role in ending Denis Lortie's killing spree in the Parliament Building on 8 May 1984. Later he served as Usher of the Black Rod for the Parliament of Canada.

Military career
Jalbert served in World War II and the Korean War, ultimately attaining the rank of major in the Royal 22e Régiment.

Sergeant-at-arms
After his military career, he served as sergeant-at-arms in the National Assembly of Quebec.

On 8 May 1984, Denis Lortie entered the Parliament Building in the morning, before government business had begun, killing three government employees and wounding 13 others on his way to the Assembly Chamber.  Upon learning of Lortie's presence, Jalbert entered the Assembly Chamber. Seeing Lortie in uniform, Jalbert showed the gunman his identification as a military veteran, opening a dialogue with him. Jalbert convinced Lortie to allow several employees to leave the premises. Then he invited Lortie into his downstairs office to discuss the situation, in effect setting himself up as hostage while removing Lortie from the scene. At extreme personal risk, Jalbert spent four hours persuading Lortie to surrender to police.

Jalbert's actions almost certainly prevented a higher death toll. For his bravery, Jalbert was awarded the Cross of Valour, Canada's highest civilian award for bravery, which was presented to him 9 November 1984, by Governor General Jeanne Sauvé in a ceremony at Rideau Hall, Ottawa.

The award citation reads:

Usher of the black rod and legacy
From July 1985 to March 1989, Jalbert was Usher of the Black Rod in the federal Parliament of Canada in Ottawa, the most senior protocol position in the Parliamentary staff.

Jalbert died at age 74 in 1996. His younger brother was film and television actor Pierre Jalbert, who died in 2014.

In 2006 a street in Quebec City was named after René Jalbert.

Awards and decorations
Jalbert's personal awards and decorations include the following:

References 

1921 births
1996 deaths
Canadian military personnel of the Korean War
Canadian Army personnel of World War II
Recipients of the Cross of Valour (Canada)
Quebec civil servants
Royal 22nd Regiment officers